Those Who Tell the Truth Shall Die, Those Who Tell the Truth Shall Live Forever is the second album recorded by post-rock band Explosions in the Sky, released on September 4, 2001. It is their first album released on the Temporary Residence label.

Cultural references

The track "Have You Passed Through This Night?" is one of the few Explosions in the Sky songs to contain any words: a sample of the narration from the film The Thin Red Line.

The track "The Moon Is Down" was based on The Moon Is Down by author John Steinbeck.

The artwork for the album, by David Logan, was inspired by the Angels of Mons.

Cultural impact 
The band garnered a small amount of media attention as the liner notes of this album contained a picture of an airplane and the text "This Plane Will Crash Tomorrow".  A rumor circulated that the album was released on September 10, 2001, the day before the September 11, 2001 attacks, but this is not true.  According to Amazon.com, the album was officially released September 4, 2001, exactly one week before the attacks.  An interview with Stylus claims the album was available as early as August 24, 2001.  Members of the band told Stylus that they had the artwork and idea for the liner notes for over a year before the attacks on the World Trade Center.

The track title "With Tired Eyes, Tired Minds, Tired Souls, We Slept" was used as an episode title for an episode of season three of the television show  One Tree Hill.

Track listing

References

External links
 Explosions in the Sky albums
 Those Who Tell the Truth Shall Die, Those Who Tell the Truth Shall Live Forever at Temporary Residence Limited

Explosions in the Sky albums
Temporary Residence Limited albums
2001 albums